Iwon station is a railway station on the Gyeongbu Line in South Korea.  It is located at Gangcheong-ri, Iwon-myeon, Okcheon-gun, Chungcheongbuk Province.  It crosses the Gyeongbu Line which is managed by KORAIL.  The station also operates trains on an interim basis for a memorial for railroad workers who died, which is located nearby.

History
 January 1, 1905: Operation started
 1945: Moved to present location by relocation of Gyeongbu Line
 May 2007: Remodeling of station completion
 May 1, 2014: Commencement of operation of Chungbuk Connection Train

References 

Railway stations in North Chungcheong Province